The King Fahd Causeway is a 25 km (15.5 mi) long series of bridges and causeways connecting Khobar, Saudi Arabia, and Al Jasra, Bahrain.  

Its five bridges rest on 536 concrete pylons, with seven embankments in the Gulf's shallower water. One of the embankments, known as Middle Island has been converted into a sizeable artificial island with customs and immigration facilities, a mosque and gardens and fast food restaurants. Another island towards the end of the causeway belongs to Bahrain and is simply known as Mother of Sleepiness.

History
The King Fahd Causeway spans long stretches of sea and reclaimed land.

The idea of building a bridge linking Bahrain to the Eastern region of Saudi Arabia had been enticing the two kingdoms for generations. The idea was born during an official visit to Bahrain in 1954 and King Saud's wish to nurture and further solidify the bond between the two.

Following Bahrain's declaration of independence, Prince Fahd bin Abdulaziz, then interior minister of Saudi Arabia, led a high-level delegation to Bahrain. At the close of the visit, Fahd said that Saudi Arabia was seriously interested in constructing a land bridge that would connect the two countries.

In 1965, plans to construct the causeway began to take form officially when Sheikh Khalifah ibn Sulman Al Khalifah, the Prime Minister of Bahrain, paid a courtesy visit to King Faisal at which time the king expressed his wish to move forward.

Subsequently, Bahrain, which drove on the left, changed to driving on the right in 1967. This was to bring it into line with neighbouring countries.  

In 1968, a joint committee was formed to assess the finances required for undertaking the task. As a result, the committee requested the World Bank contribute assistance to implement the mammoth-sized project including environmental and geographical aspects of the region.

The idea of constructing the causeway was based on improving the links and bonds between Saudi Arabia and Bahrain. Maritime surveying began in 1968,  construction began in 1981 and continued until the official opening to the public in 1986. 
Since its completion in 1986, the causeway has streamlined commerce and strengthened cultural and social bonds between Saudi Arabia and Bahrain.

In the summer of 1973, King Faisal, in a meeting which included Emir Sheikh Isa bin Salman Al Khalifa as well as prince Fahd bin Abdul Aziz and Sheikh Khalifa bin Salman Al Khalifa, suggested the committee overlook economic and financial issues with the project instead concentrating on the actual construction. 

In 1975, the World Bank submitted its study and advice after seeking assistance from specialist international expertise in studying the geographic, environmental factors and maritime currents.

In the spring of 1976, during a visit by King Khalid bin Abdul Aziz to Sheikh Isa bin Salman Al Khalifa, the two monarchs agreed to set up a ministerial committee to work on implementation of the project.

On 8 July 1981, Mohammed Aba Al-Khail, minister for Finance and National Economy of Saudi Arabia and Yousuf Ahmed Al-Shirawi, minister of Industrial Development in Bahrain signed an agreement to start construction on the maritime causeway.

On 11 November 1982, King Fahd bin Abdul Aziz and Sheikh Isa bin Salman Al Khalifa unveiled the curtain on the Memorial Plaque during a formal ceremony attended by leaders of the GCC states marking the beginning of the project.

On 11 April 1985, Shaikh Khalifa bin Salman Al Khalifa, the Prime Minister of Bahrain, pressed the button to install the final part of the box bridges thereby finally linking Saudi mainland with the island of Bahrain.

On 26 November 1986, the causeway was officially inaugurated in the presence of King Fahd and Shaikh Isa bin Salman Al Khalifa, with the latter consenting to naming the bridge King Fahd Causeway.

, an estimated 25,104 vehicles use the causeway daily. The 2010 total number of travelers across the causeway from both countries was 19.1 million passengers, or an average of 52,450 passengers per day.

Construction details
The project cost a total of US$800 million (SAR3 billion). Al-Muhandis Nizar Kurdi Consulting Engineers was the sole Saudi partner of the consulting group (Saudi Danish Consultants) which completed the study, design and construction supervision of the Causeway. One of the major contractors of the project was Ballast Nedam, based in the Netherlands. It is unclear how many workers were engaged in the construction of the Causeway. The causeway was constructed in three segments starting from Saudi Arabia:
 From Al-Aziziyyah, south of Khobar, to the Border Station on Passport Island
 From the Border Station to Nasan Island in Bahrain
 From Nasan island to  Al-Jasra, Northern Governorate, on the main island of Bahrain

Strict quality control regimes were established to ensure durability of the structure. In this regard, Al Hoty Stanger Ltd, the premier testing laboratory with SASO accreditation, was contracted to perform materials testing on both sides of the causeway project.

The production equipment for the bridge segments were supplied by the Dutch machine building company H.J. Grimbergen B.V.

Border station 
This artificial island is known as Passport Island or Middle Island. The buildings of King Fahd Causeway Authority and other government Directorates were erected on the Border Station, as well as two mosques, two Coast Guard towers and two  tower restaurants. The border station also has extensive landscaping all around the islands in addition to the services and road stations.

The Border Station was designed as two connected islands, with the west side designated as Saudi Arabian and the east as Bahraini. The Saudi side of the Border Station has outlets of McDonald's and Kudu while the Bahraini side of the Border Station has a McDonald's outlet.

One-stop crossing was introduced on the King Fahad Causeway from 6 March 2017. Under the new system, commuters will only have to stop at one post for passport control, car clearance and customs. The measure will ease travel for commuters and is also expected to ease traffic congestion on the highway as the previous system required multiple stops at Saudi and Bahraini check posts.

Expansion
On 6 July 2010, Saudi newspapers quoted King Fahd Causeway Authority chief Bader Abdullah Al-Otaishan as saying that the King Fahd Causeway was to undergo a major expansion projected to cost $5.3 million. It was announced that the number of departure lanes would be increased from 10 to 17 and the number of arrival lanes from 13 to 18 on both sides. The renovation includes construction of a commercial center on the Bahraini side.

"It will have a number of restaurants, coffee shops, a grocery shop, telephone stalls and a shop to meet travelers’ needs," said Al-Otaishan. "We saw that there was a need for such a center to assist travelers". With points including climate-controlled washrooms and meeting places, the average traveler can be better facilitated. He said work was under way and that the center would be completed by the first quarter of the next year. A Bahraini health center was also being built to serve travelers and causeway staff.
"It will feature an emergency room and ambulance to serve whoever is using the causeway — travelers or employees," he said, noting a Saudi health center was also planned for 2011. A security checkpoint near the Bahraini entrance of the causeway was to be added to the checkpoint near the Saudi entrance. "It will allow us to control the causeway and close it," Al-Otaishan said.

The project also included expanded public utilities such as washrooms and mosques on both sides of the causeway, to be completed by the end of 2011. A separate project, to revamp the two tower restaurants, one Saudi and one Bahraini, was announced. The renovation would not alter the towers' historic appearance. Al-Otaishan told local newspapers that tenders for the project on the Saudi side had already been approved, with the Bahraini side set to follow suit.

See also 
 King Hamad Causeway
 List of things named after Saudi kings
 Qatar–Bahrain Causeway
 List of longest bridges in the world

References

External links 

 
 King Fahd Causeway at Saudinf.com
 History of King Fahd Causeway
 King Fahad Causeway at TheBahrain.com 

International bridges
Bahrain–Saudi Arabia border crossings
Causeways
Road bridges in Bahrain
Bridges completed in 1986
Bridges in Saudi Arabia
Toll bridges
Cross-sea bridges in Asia
Roads in Bahrain
Roads in Saudi Arabia
1986 establishments in Bahrain
1986 establishments in Saudi Arabia